Chouteau Township is an inactive township in Clay County, in the U.S. state of Missouri.

References

Townships in Missouri
Townships in Clay County, Missouri